Gary Abraham (born 8 January 1959) is a male English former competitive swimmer.

Swimming career
Abraham represented Great Britain in the Olympics and FINA world championships, as well as England in the Commonwealth games, during the 1970s and early 1980s.  Abraham was an Olympic Games and Commonwealth Games medallist. As a 17-year-old, Abraham represented Great Britain at the 1980 Summer Olympics in  Montreal, Quebec.  He competed in the 100-metre backstroke, and swam the backstroke leg for the British team in the preliminary heats of the men's 4x100-metre medley relay.

Abraham represented England at the 1978 Commonwealth Games in Edmonton, Alberta, Canada, winning two silver medals in the 100-metre backstroke and the 4x100-metre medley relay. At the ASA National British Championships he won the 100 metres backstroke title six times (1975, 1976, 1977, 1978, 1979, 1981) and the 200 metres backstroke title in 1978.

At the 1980 Summer Olympics in Moscow, he earned a bronze medal by swimming the backstroke leg for the third-place British team in the 4×100-metre medley relay.  He was the first swimmer to utilize the rule permitting swimmers to swim 15 metres underwater at start of certain events.

Abraham retired from competitive swimming in 1983.  He currently coaches at Eastleigh Swimming Club.

Personal bests
 Long course (50 m)

 Short course (33m)

 Short course (25 m)

See also

 List of Commonwealth Games medallists in swimming (men)
 List of Olympic medalists in swimming (men)

References

External links

1959 births
Living people
Commonwealth Games silver medallists for England
English male swimmers
Male backstroke swimmers
Miami Hurricanes men's swimmers
Olympic bronze medallists for Great Britain
Olympic bronze medalists in swimming
Olympic swimmers of Great Britain
Swimmers at the 1976 Summer Olympics
Swimmers at the 1980 Summer Olympics
World Aquatics Championships medalists in swimming
Medalists at the 1980 Summer Olympics
Commonwealth Games medallists in swimming
Swimmers at the 1978 Commonwealth Games
Medallists at the 1978 Commonwealth Games